Gandara, officially the Municipality of Gandara (Waray: Bungto han Gandara),  is a 2nd class municipality in the province of Samar, Philippines. According to the 2020 census, it has a population of 35,242 people.

The town was formerly named Bangahon, but its population was resettled to its current location on September 29, 1902. After settling in its new location, the name Gandara was given to it in commemoration of the former Governor General José de la Gándara y Navarro.

Climate

Demographics

Based on latest 2014 survey, the total population was 33,264, consisting of 17,046 males and 16,218 females. The number of households was 6,653, with an average household size of 4.87 persons and a density of 68/km2. Built-up Area population density at town proper 6,652 along Carline Area is 4,992, Coastal Area is 5,751 and Rural Area is 5,748.

Economy

The municipality of Gandara is known for its products such as queseo (kesong puti), tablea, tinapa (smoked fish), kalinayan rice, rootcrops and peanuts exported in the entire region of Eastern Visayas and to any point of the Philippine archipelago. Queseo is one of its tourism and livelihood assets.

Tourism

Maria Diana’s Chapel Gandara is the home also of the well-known corpse of Maria Diana Alvarez believed to be miraculous by the Gandareños.

Karabaw Festival A festival which pays tribute to the draft animal that helps people till their farms and provides milk for Gandara’s local white cheese delicacy called “Queseo”. The festival itself has proven a lot in terms of creativity and uniqueness. In fact, it has already won 7 times in the Samar Day Celebration observed every August 11 where all municipalities and cities in Samar gather at the provincial capitol in Catbalogan to perform and compete.

Annual Fluvial Parade The traditional fluvial procession along the river of Gandara held every month of September is a significant and mainstay event of the yearly fiesta celebration.

Bangahon Church Ruins The Ruins of Bangahon is a historical landmark near the right fork of Gandara river. It was once a town during the revolutionary period, but was abandoned by the old residents who later found the present town of Gandara. The site was the original homage to St. Michael the Archangel, the patron saint of the townspeople, located in Brgy. Bangahon, Gandara, Samar. The said place of worship was ruined during the Pulajanes-American war. The American used Field Guns destroying the said church. It was noted for its Bangahon Bell (Lingganay). This bell was sequestered by the Americans on September 29, 1901, at Balangiga. The bell of Bangahon church is believed to be one of those Balangiga bells.

Education

Secondary education

 Saint Michael's High School (SMHS)
 Ramon T. Diaz National High School(RTDNHS) (formerly Ramon T. Diaz Memorial High School / Gandara National High School)
 Piñaplata Integrated School

References

External links

 [ Philippine Standard Geographic Code]
 Philippine Census Information
 Local Governance Performance Management System 

Municipalities of Samar (province)